The Boeing X-46 was a proposed unmanned combat air vehicle (UCAV) that was to be developed in conjunction with the United States Navy and DARPA as a naval carrier-based variant of the Boeing X-45 UCAV being developed for the U.S. Air Force. Two contracts for technology demonstrators were awarded in June 2000, to Boeing for the X-46A and to Northrop Grumman for the X-47A.

However, in April 2003, the Air Force and the Navy efforts were formally combined under the joint DARPA/USAF/Navy J-UCAV program, later renamed J-UCAS (Joint Unmanned Combat Air Systems), and the X-46 program was terminated as redundant.

A Navy-only N-UCAS demonstrator program started in the summer of 2006.  Boeing will use material developed for the X-46 and X-45 to propose the X-45N as a naval UCAV demonstrator.

References

External links

 Boeing X-45 / X-46 Page

X-46
Unmanned aerial vehicles of the United States
Single-engined jet aircraft
Cancelled military aircraft projects of the United States
DARPA